Luciano Zecchini (born 10 March 1949) is an Italian professional football coach and a former player, who played as a defender.

Career
Zecchini began playing football with local side Forlì. After a spell with lower-level sides Patro, he joined Brescia in 1969, where he would make his Serie A debut against Roma on 21 September 1969. He played 11 seasons (229 games, 2 goals) in the Serie A for Brescia Calcio, Torino Calcio, A.C. Milan, U.C. Sampdoria and Perugia Calcio.

He made his debut for the Italy national football team on 28 September 1974 in a game against Yugoslavia.

His playing career on a professional level ended with a 3-year ban from football in the Totonero 1980 match-fixing scandal.

Honours
Torino
 Coppa Italia winner: 1970–71.

References

External links
 

1949 births
Living people
Italian footballers
Italy under-21 international footballers
Italy international footballers
Serie A players
A.C. Prato players
Brescia Calcio players
Torino F.C. players
A.C. Milan players
U.C. Sampdoria players
A.C. Perugia Calcio players
U.S. Massese 1919 players
Italian football managers
Calcio Lecco 1912 managers
A.S.D. SolbiaSommese Calcio managers
Aurora Pro Patria 1919 managers
Rimini F.C. 1912 managers
Teramo Calcio managers
A.S. Sambenedettese managers
Association football defenders